Sclerophrys buchneri, also known as Buchner's toad, is a species of toad in the family Bufonidae. It is found in the Cabinda Province of Angola and western Republic of the Congo, presumably also in Democratic Republic of the Congo. The biology of this species is essentially unknown. It might even be synonym of Sclerophrys funereus.

References

buchneri
Frogs of Africa
Amphibians of Angola
Amphibians of the Republic of the Congo
Taxa named by Wilhelm Peters
Amphibians described in 1882
Taxonomy articles created by Polbot